Ceroglossus buqueti is a beetle of the family Carabidae.

Description
This species presents marked chromatic polymorphism and morphological variations in shape and in size depending on subspecies and populations. These beetles have a diurnal habit and are predators on small organisms.

Distribution
This species is endemic to the evergreen forests of Chile. The subspecies Ceroglossus buqueti argentinensis occurs in Argentina. These ground beetles prefer xeric habitats and are very tolerant of arid environment.

Subspecies
 Ceroglossus buqueti andestus Kraatz-Koschlau, 1887
 Ceroglossus buqueti argentinensis Jiroux, 1996
 Ceroglossus buqueti arieli Jiroux, 1996
 Ceroglossus buqueti arriagadai  Jiroux, 1996
 Ceroglossus buqueti breuningi Heinz & Jiroux, 2001
 Ceroglossus buqueti buqueti Laporte de Castelnau, 1834
 Ceroglossus buqueti calvus Géhin, 1885
 Ceroglossus buqueti cecilae Jiroux, 2006
 Ceroglossus buqueti cherquencoensis Dorsselaer, 1955
 Ceroglossus buqueti chiloensis Hope, 1837
 Ceroglossus buqueti deuveiJiroux, 1996
 Ceroglossus buqueti leopardalinus Rataj & Godeau, 2010
 Ceroglossus buqueti lorenzi Jiroux, 1998
 Ceroglossus buqueti magdalenaensis Jiroux, 1996
 Ceroglossus buqueti peladosus Kraatz-Koschlau, 1887
 Ceroglossus buqueti snizeki Jiroux, 2006
 Ceroglossus buqueti subnitens Kraatz-Koschlau, 1885
 Ceroglossus buqueti sybarita Gerstaecker, 1858

References
 Biolib
 Universal Biological Indexer

External links
 Carabidae

Carabinae
Beetles described in 1834